The Chiapan climbing rat (Tylomys bullaris) is a species of rodent in the family Cricetidae.
It is found only in Mexico. The species is known from only one location in Tuxtla Gutiérrez, Chiapas. The habitat in the region is being converted to agricultural and urban use, which is likely causing critical declines in numbers of T. bullaris.

References
Citations

Sources
Musser, G. G. and M. D. Carleton. 2005. Superfamily Muroidea. pp. 894–1531 in Mammal Species of the World a Taxonomic and Geographic Reference. D. E. Wilson and D. M. Reeder eds. Johns Hopkins University Press, Baltimore.

Tylomys
EDGE species
Mammals described in 1901
Taxonomy articles created by Polbot